Jeremy Joseph Lopez (born 9 July 1989) is a Gibraltarian footballer who plays for Gibraltar National League side Bruno's Magpies and the Gibraltar national team, where he plays as a right winger.

International career
Lopez made his international debut with Gibraltar on 19 November 2013 in a 0-0 home draw with Slovakia. This was Gibraltar's first game since being admitted to UEFA

International career statistics

International goals
Scores and results list Gibraltar's goal tally first.

References

Notes

External links

 
 
 
 

1989 births
Living people
Gibraltarian footballers
Gibraltar international footballers
Association football midfielders
F.C. Bruno's Magpies players
Europa Point F.C. players
Gibraltar Phoenix F.C. players
Lions Gibraltar F.C. players
Lynx F.C. players
Manchester 62 F.C. players
Gibraltar Premier Division players
Gibraltar pre-UEFA international footballers